Patriarch Raphaël Bedros XXI Minassian, I.C.P.B. (born 24 November 1946) is a Lebanese-born hierarch who serves as the 21st patriarch of the Armenian Catholic Church. He previously served as ordinary of the Ordinariate for Catholics of Armenian Rite in Eastern Europe, which covers Armenia, Georgia, Russia, and Ukraine, from 24 June 2011 to 23 September 2021 and as a Patriarchal Exarch of the Armenian Catholic Patriarchal Exarchate of Jerusalem and Amman from 26 September 2005 to 24 June 2011.

Life
Raphaël François Minassian was born in Beirut, Lebanon on 24 November 1946. After the primary school education, he joined the Minor seminary of the Patriarchal Congregation of Bzommar in 1958, where he later made a profession. After that, he went on to study in Rome at the Pontifical Levonian Armenian College. He studied at the Pontifical Gregorian University, earning a licentiate in philosophy and theology, and at the Salesian Pontifical University, where he earned a degree in the practical psychology. He was ordained a priest on 24 June 1973.

He then worked in various Armenian Catholic institutions in Lebanon and in the United States and at the same time performed pastoral work for the Armenian Catholics. On 26 September 2005, he was appointed Patriarchal Exarch of the Armenian Catholic Patriarchal Exarchate of Jerusalem and Amman, where he served almost six years.

On 24 June 2011, Pope Benedict XVI appointed Minassian ordinary of the Ordinariate for Catholics of Armenian Rite in Eastern Europe.  He received his episcopal consecration on 16 July from Patriarch Nerses Bedros XIX Tarmouni, the Head of the Armenian Catholic Church.

On 23 September 2021, he was elected as the Church's 21st patriarch and took the name Raphaël Bedros XXI Minassian. He was enthroned as Catholicos Patriarch of Cilicia of Armenian Catholics on 24 October 2021 in Armenian Catholic Cathedral of Saint Elias and Saint Gregory the Illuminator in Beirut.

See also
 List of Armenian Catholic patriarchs of Cilicia

References

1946 births
Living people
Religious leaders from Beirut
Members of the Patriarchal Congregation of Bzommar
Pontifical Gregorian University alumni
Salesian Pontifical University alumni
Armenian Catholic bishops
Lebanese people of Armenian descent
21st-century Eastern Catholic bishops
Armenian Catholic Patriarchs of Cilicia